Wingham railway station is located on the North Coast line in New South Wales, Australia. It serves the town of Wingham, opening on 5 February 1913 when the line was extended from Dungog to Taree.

Platforms & services
Wingham has one platform with a passing loop opposite. Each day northbound XPT services operate to Grafton, Casino and Brisbane, with three southbound services operating to Sydney. This station is a request stop for the northbound Brisbane XPT and the southbound Casino XPT. so these services only stop here if passengers have booked to board/alight here.

References

External links
Wingham station details Transport for New South Wales

Railway stations in Australia opened in 1913
Regional railway stations in New South Wales
North Coast railway line, New South Wales